Linz is the capital of Upper Austria and third-largest city in Austria. In the north of the country, it is on the Danube , south of the Czech border. In 2018, the population was 204,846.

In 2009, it was a European Capital of Culture.

Geography 
Linz is in the centre of Europe, lying on the Paris–Budapest west–east axis and the Malmö–Trieste north–south axis. The Danube is the main tourism and transport connection that runs through the city.

A further 17.95% are covered with forest. All the rest areas fall on water (6.39%), traffic areas, and land.

Districts
Since January 2014 the city has been divided into 16 statistical districts:

Before 2014 Linz was divided into nine districts and 36 statistical quarters. They were:

Ebelsberg
Innenstadt: Altstadtviertel, Rathausviertel, Kaplanhofviertel, Neustadtviertel, Volksgartenviertel, Römerberg-Margarethen
Kleinmünchen: Kleinmünchen, Neue Welt, Scharlinz, Bergern, Neue Heimat, Wegscheid, Schörgenhub
Lustenau: Makartviertel, Franckviertel, Hafenviertel
Pöstlingberg: Pöstlingberg, Bachl-Gründberg
St. Magdalena: St. Magdalena, Katzbach, Elmberg
St. Peter
Urfahr: Alt-Urfahr, Heilham, Hartmayrsiedlung, Harbachsiedlung, Karlhofsiedlung, Auberg
Waldegg: Freinberg, Froschberg, Keferfeld, Bindermichl, Spallerhof, Wankmüllerhofviertel, Andreas-Hofer-Platz-Viertel

History

The city was founded by the Romans, who called it Lentia. The name Linz was first recorded in AD 799.

It was a provincial and local government city of the Holy Roman Empire, and an important trading point connecting several routes, on either side of the river Danube from the east to the west and Bohemia and Poland from north to the Balkans and Italy to the south. Being the city where the Habsburg Emperor Friedrich III spent his last years, it was, for a short period of time, the most important city in the empire. It lost its status to Vienna and Prague after the death of the Emperor in 1493.

One important inhabitant of the city was the age of discovery-era astronomer and mathematician Johannes Kepler, who spent several years of his life in the city teaching mathematics. On May 15, 1618, he discovered the distance-cubed-over-time-squared—or "third"—law of planetary motion. The local public university, Johannes Kepler University Linz, is named after him.

Another noted citizen was Anton Bruckner, who spent the years between 1855 and 1868 working as a local composer and organist in the Old Cathedral, Linz. The Brucknerhaus is named after him.

Adolf Hitler was born in Braunau am Inn (an Austrian town near the German border) and moved to Linz during his childhood. Hitler spent most of his youth in the Linz area, from 1898 until 1907, when he left for Vienna. The family lived first in the village of Leonding on the outskirts of town, and then on the Humboldtstrasse in Linz. After elementary education in Leonding, Hitler was enrolled in the Realschule (secondary or high school), as was the philosopher Ludwig Wittgenstein. Notorious Holocaust architect Adolf Eichmann also spent his youth in Linz. Until the end of his life, Hitler considered Linz to be his hometown, and envisioned extensive architectural schemes for it – including a massive new Führermuseum to house his collection of looted art – wanting it to become the main cultural centre of the Third Reich, and to eclipse Vienna, a city he hated.

To make the city economically vibrant, Hitler initiated a major industrialization of Linz shortly before, and during, the Second World War.

Near the end of World War II, Hitler became enamoured of the musical compositions of Anton Bruckner, and, as a result, planned to convert the monastery of St. Florian in Linz – where Bruckner had played the organ, and where he was buried – into a repository of Bruckner's manuscripts.

Hitler evicted the monks from the building and personally paid for the restoration of the organ and the institution of a Bruckner study center there. He also paid for the Haas collection of Bruckner's works to be published, and himself purchased material for the proposed library.

Additionally, Hitler effected the founding of the Bruckner Symphony Orchestra, which began presenting concerts in Fall 1943. His plan for one of the bell towers in Linz to play a theme from Bruckner's Fourth Symphony never came to pass. In addition to an ordnance depot, Linz had a benzol (oil) plant which was bombed during the Oil Campaign on 16 October 1944.

In May 2001, seven scientific publications, online presentations, and numerous lectures were made public as a result of these efforts. The culture of remembrance extended to the construction of monuments for the victims of National Socialism. Especially since 1988, numerous memorials have been created in public spaces.

The city's confrontation with its Nazi past resulted in the renaming of many streets. In 1945, immediately after the end of the Nazi dictatorship, 39 streets in Linz were renamed, whereas from 1946 to 1987, only two streets were renamed. However, since 1988, 17 new traffic areas were named after victims of National Socialism or resistance fighters. In the recent past a number of Nazi victims and activists who fought Nazism were honored by the city. Simon Wiesenthal, who founded the first Jewish Documentation Center in Linz in 1945, received an award for his work in remembrance of victims of the Second World War.

In 1975, Linz upgraded the college founded in 1966 to become the country's highest form of academic institution, the Johannes Kepler University. It was established in a  park centered around a pond in the northeast of the city.

Coat of arms
The coat of arms of Linz developed from the seal image, which was used as emblem since 1242. It showed the open city gate flanked by two crenellated towers on rocky ground. From 1288 on, the gate was shown standing on water.
The coat of arms shows a red plate on which stands a castle with twin towers. Those towers are crowned with three crenellations. The towers include an open door; above the door the red-white-red shield of Austria is attached.
The gate and towers symbolise the medieval fortified city. The wavy bars indicate the position of the city near the River Danube. The Austrian shield is a reference to the former territorial city.

Population
The urban area includes (parts of) 13 other municipalities with together 271,000 inhabitants. Linz is also part of the Linz-Wels-Steyr metropolitan area of Upper Austria, home to around one third of the state's population (460,000 people) and second-largest urban area in Austria. Linz has a total of about 157,000 jobs. However, only half of the vacant jobs can be covered by its inhabitants. This large job surplus causes a correspondingly high rate of commuting from the surrounding communities of Linz, resulting in extensive traffic problems.

The foreign born percentage is estimated to be at 28.1% of the total population in 2018.

Climate
Linz has an oceanic climate (Köppen climate classification: Cfb) or, following the 0 °C isotherm, a humid continental climate (Dfb) with warm summers and quite cold winters. Because Linz is also continental influenced, it does snow there and even has sometimes a snow cover without melting for at least a week or more as temperatures in January (mostly) stay below the freezing point.

Tourism 
In 2018, Germans were the most frequent guests from other countries, followed by tourists from China (including Hong Kong and Macao), making Italians 3rd in comparison with the years before – the ranking is nearly equal to the overnight stays ranking which is listed in the following. Most of restaurants and cafés are closed on Sundays.

Economy

Linz is one of the main economic centres of Austria. Voestalpine is a large technology and capital goods group (founded as the "Hermann-Göring-Werke" during the Second World War), which is known for the LD- ("Linz-Donawitz") procedure for the production of steel. The former "Chemie Linz" chemical group has been split up into several companies. These companies have made Linz one of Austria's most important economic centres.

Furthermore, due to the fact that one of the four Donau-Harbors (Donauhäfen) in Austria is located in Linz, it constitutes an attractive location in regards to logistic and trading enterprises. Nonetheless, manufacturing plants can – for instance - be found at the waterfront as well. The economic importance of Linz was founded over centuries in trade. Moreover, the long-standing image of Linz as an industrial city was a result of the National Socialism. As a result of this large industrial enterprises are still located in Linz nowadays. Important examples are the Voestalpine AG or "Chemie Linz" – as already mentioned above. From an economical perspective they represent a large number of jobs and of course industry related enterprises.

The Meeting Industry Report Austria (mira) ranks Linz as the third most important destination for congresses in Austria, with a share of 7.4% in the total number of congresses, conferences and seminars held in Austria. Linz has more than 60 congress and event venues. With the Blue Meeting concept, the local tourism association has developed a conference format which focuses on individual needs of participants and adapts to the idea of green meetings, therefore supporting waste prevention, energy efficiency, climate-neutral travel and regional added value.

Shopping 

Thirteen malls can be found in Linz, three of which are situated in the city centre. Shopping centres include: Arkade, Atrium City Center, Shopping Mall Auwiesen, Shopping Mall Biesenfeld, Shopping Mall Industriezeile, Shopping Mall Kleinmünchen, Shopping Mall Muldenstraße, EuroCenter Oed, Shopping Mall Wegscheid, Infra Center, Lentia City, Passage, and PRO-Kaufland.

According to a study of Infrapool in Oktober 2010, the Linzer Landstraße is the busiest shopping street outside of Vienna. The weekly frequency is noted between 240,500 (Monday-Saturday, 8 a.m. until 7 p.m.) and 228,400 (8 a.m. until 6 p.m.) passers-by, which is the second highest value - only in 2005 more passers-by were detected. Further shopping streets in Linz:

Linz north:
Alturfahr West
Hauptstraße Urfahr

Linz centre:
City
Altstadt
Pfarrplatz
Promenade
Eisenhandstraße
Südbahnhofmarkt

Linz south:
Einkaufsviertel Wiener Straße
Franckviertel
Bindermichl
Kleinmünchen
Ebelsberg

Close to Linz:
Plus City shopping center

Markets 
There are eleven farmer's markets as well as one weekly flea market and two Christmas markets in Linz. One of these markets, the "Urfahraner Markt", takes place in spring and fall every year. Furthermore, there are annually Christmas and New Year's Markets. The aim of the market administration is to provide the population with a wide range of products, as well as operating the markets in an economical, suitable and customer oriented manner. Additionally, the annual market called "Linzer Marktfrühling" sets further accents and lures new customers with attractive offers.

Transport 

Linz serves as an important transport hub for the region of both Upper Austria and, to a lesser degree, southern Bohemia.

The airport can be reached easily via federal highways B139 and B1. The bus line 601 connects the airport within 20 minutes with the centre of Linz. There is also a free shuttle service from Hörsching railway station. Direct flights include Frankfurt, Düsseldorf and Vienna with additional seasonal routes added during the summer and winter months, like for example Mallorca, Ibiza, Tenerife, several Greek islands (like Kos, Rhodes, Crete or Corfu) or Hurghada. Ryanair also flies to London Stansted Airport.

The city also has a central railway station on Austria's main rail axis, the West railway, linking Vienna with western Austria, Germany and Switzerland. The Linz central station has been awarded eight times (from 2005 to 2011 and 2014) by Austrian Traffic Club as the most beautiful train station in Austria.

There are also varying types of river transport on the Danube, from industrial barges to tourist cruise ships.

Local public transport comprises the city tram network, the city trolleybus network and the city bus network, all operated by the Linz Linien division of Linz AG. The city tram network includes the Pöstlingbergbahn, a steeply graded tramway which climbs a small mountain at the northwest edge of the town.

Public safety
The National Police Directorate forms the security authority for the city. The city's police commands function as law enforcement agencies.

In Linz, one of six Austrian professional fire brigades is located. Four volunteer fire brigades (Ebelsberg, Pichling, Pöstlingberg, St. Magdalena) and nine company fire brigades complement Linz' firemanship. Additionally, the national school of firemanship, which is subjected to the Upper Austrian fire-brigade federation, is located in Linz. In this school, all members of Upper Austrian fire brigades are being educated.

Media
The newspaper Oberösterreichische Nachrichten has its head office in Linz.

Points of interest

The main street "Landstraße" leads from the "Blumauerplatz" to "Taubenmarkt" (Pigeonmarket) near the main square. In the middle of the main square the high "Pestsäule" ("plague column", also known as "Dreifaltigkeitssäule" (Dreifaltigkeit means Holy Trinity)) was built to remember the people who died in the plague epidemics.

Around the main square are many historically relevant and architecturally interesting houses, such as the Old Town Hall, the Feichtinger House with its carillon, which changes the melody depending on the season, the Kirchmayr House, the Schmidtberger House or the bridgehead buildings, which house a part of the Linz Art University.

West of the main square there is the old quarter with many other historic buildings, such as Renaissance houses or older houses with a baroque face.

Near the Schloss/castle, being the former residence of emperor Friedrich the III—the oldest Austrian church is located: Sankt/Saint Martins church. It was built during early medieval Carolingian times.

Other points of interest include:

St. Mary's Cathedral (Mariä-Empfängnis-Dom), Roman Catholic, in Gothic-Revival style. Constructed in the years of 1862 and 1924, it is fully built of sandstone with unfinished front details. 
Ursuline Church of St. Michael, 18th-century Catholic church with two towers and a late baroque facade.
Mozarthaus is the house, dating to the end of the 16th century, where the famous Austrian composer Wolfgang Amadeus Mozart composed the "Linz" Symphony and "Linz" Sonata during a three-day stay there in November 1783. Today, the exterior and inner courtyard of the house can be visited, but not the interior. 
Pöstlingberg-Kirche: pilgrimage church on the Pöstlingberg hill. The basilica is the city's landmark and was built from 1738 until 1774, located on 537m sea level. 
Pöstlingbergbahn is the steepest mountain rail in the world which was built in 1898 and operates gear-wheel free (functional grip between wheel and rail: gradient of 10.5%) 
Linzer Grottenbahn: A grotto railway is based up on the hill of Pöstling
Brucknerhaus: the concert and congress house located on the Donaulände was first opened in 1973 and is venue of the Brucknerfest since 1974. It is named after the composer Anton Bruckner, who was born in Ansfelden, a small town next to Linz. The modern Concert Hall owes its unique acoustics to its wood paneling. The Great Hall of the Bruckner House, also called Brucknersaal, is the architectural jewel hosting an organ consisting of more than 4,200 pipes and 51 registers. The spacious stage in particular was designed for 220 performers. In 2017 the life and works of Anton Bruckner were the focus of the Bruckner Festival held under the motto "Bruckner elementar". Bruckner's works were the focus of the festival presented by national and international artists.
Gugl Stadium, is home to the LASK (Linzer Athletik Sport Klub), which is claimed to be the third oldest football club in Austria.
Linzer Landestheater
Kremsmünsterer Haus: is to find at the "Alter Markt", located in the inner city of Linz where, as legends say, emperor Friedrich III. had died.
Landhaus: The country house was built in the 16th century and is the headquarters of the governor, the upper Austrian parliament and the government of upper Austria. Johannes Kepler used to teach here for more than 14 years.

Other attractions include the museums listed below, as well as several buildings which are illuminated in the evening (such as the Ars Electronica Center or the Lentos Art Museum), the Tobacco Factory, the Danube Lands, the port of Linz including Mural Harbor, the Voestalpine Stahlwelt or the District Urfahr. In the immediate vicinity is the Pöstlingberg, close to the baroque pilgrimage basilica, the Linz zoo, or the fairytale and dwarf kingdom of the Linzer Grottenbahn.

Architecture 

As many central European cities, the cityscape of Linz is characterised by small and several sacred buildings. The Mariä Empfängnis Dom or New Cathedral is the biggest church in Austria, not by height (it is roughly 2 metres shorter than the St. Stephen's Cathedral (Stephansdom) in Vienna), but by capacity.

The historic centre is characterised by its medieval architectural style, whereas in those parts of the city that border with the historic centre the architecture is of neoclassical, neo-baroque and neo-renaissance styles. Even further from the historic centre there are living areas, such as Franckviertel, Froschberg, Bindermichl and Kleinmünchen southern of the Danube and Alt-Urfahr northern of the Danube. These areas are where residential buildings can be found that are still referred to as "Hitlerbauten" or "Hitler buildings", because they were built during the interwar period and the time of Nazi dictatorship. The residential area called Gugl became a well liked living area among the wealthy at around 1900, which is why there are numerous villas still there today.

Amongst the newer buildings is the Linz Hauptbahnhof station, which was designed by Wilhelm Holzbauer and added the Terminal Tower skyscraper as part of a mixed-use complex. Between 2005 und 2011 it was voted Austria's most beautiful railway station seven times in a row by the Verkehrsclub Österreich. The Wissensturm ("Tower of knowledge") with a height of about 63 metres, houses the public library and the Volkshochschule, an adult education centre. It was designed by Franz Kneidinger and Heinz Stögmüller and opened in 2007. Lentos Art Museum, which opened in 2003, was designed by Zürich-based architects Weber & Hofer and the Musiktheater (music theatre), which opened in 2013, was designed by Terry Pawson.

Cemeteries 
Linz has 13 cemeteries, four of them are supervised by the LINZ AG.

Friedhof der Israelitischen Kultusgemeinde
Friedhof Ebelsberg
Friedhof Pöstlingberg
Friedhof St. Margarethen
Friedhof St. Magdalena
Friedhof Urfahr
Soldatenfriedhof beim Petrinum 
St. Barbarafriedhof
Stadtfriedhof Linz / St. Martin
Urnenhain Feuerhalle
Urnenhain Kleinmünchen
Urnenhain Neue Verabschiedungshalle
Urnenhain Urfahr

Culture

The city is now home to a vibrant music and arts scene that is well-funded by the city and the state of Upper Austria. Between Lentos Art Museum and the "Brucknerhaus", is the "Donaulände", which is also referred to as "Kulturmeile" ("culture mile"). This is a park alongside the river, which is used mainly by young people to relax and meet in summer. It is also used for the Ars Electronica Festival in early September and the "Stream Festival", which takes place annually. In June, July and August the "Musikpavillon" is placed in the park where musical groups of different styles perform on Thursdays, Fridays, Saturdays and Sundays free of charge. 
Linz has other culture institutions, such as the Posthof, which is near the harbour, and the Stadtwerkstatt, which is by the river Danube. The Pflasterspektakel, an international street art festival, takes place each year in July in and around the Landstraße and the main square.
Linz was the European Capital of Culture in 2009, along with Vilnius, the capital of Lithuania.

On 1 December 2014 Linz was accepted into the international network of UNESCO Creative Cities (UCCN) as a City of Media Arts. Currently 69 cities worldwide are members of the Creative Cities network, which is divided into seven thematic categories: literature, film, music, folk art, design, media art and gastronomy. The title goes to cities which enrich urban life and successfully involve society in electronic art forms through the sponsorship and integration of media art. Seven more cities can call themselves City of Media Arts: Enghien-les-Bains, Lyon, Sapporo, Dakar, Gwangju, Tel Aviv-Yafo and York.

The aim is therefore to maintain and represent the cultural diversity. The 69 cities share their experiences and think about ways to cope with globalization. To create the most intensive discourse possible with the other creative cities, Linz has to do a self-evaluation after a few years. After three years the UNESCO evaluated whether Linz has fulfilled certain measures in the field of media art and may continue to use the title.
The Ars Electronica Center can be considered as the centre of media art and attracts every year during its festival national and international guests to Linz.

The latest project developed by Linz in the context of the City of Media Arts project is the Valie Export Center, which is located in the Tabakfabrik (tobacco factory) and carried out in cooperation with the University of Art and Design Linz. It serves as an international research hub for media and performance art. Beyond that, it comprises the legacy as well as the archives of the most renowned media artist coming from Linz, Valie Export, who has received numerous national as well as international prizes. Along with the Ars Electronica archives, Linz hosts two internationally renowned archives for media art. These archives serve as a starting point for an artistic and a scientific interaction with media and performance art both in Austria and around the world.

Since 2009, the Open Commons Linz initiative has made available a wide variety of "free" data: geo-data and statistical information having to do with city life, local government, recreation and tourism. An associated effort is the Hotspot initiative that has installed 202 hotspots providing free WLAN, as well as Public Server, the municipal cloud available to all citizens registered in Linz. Linz is thus at the forefront in Europe when it comes to universal access to open data.

Linz houses 43 galleries and exhibit rooms, 13 cultural centres, one club centre, as well as four educational institutes.

Museums 
The Lentos (built 2003) is a modern art gallery, presenting art from the 20th and 21st centuries. It is situated on the south banks of the river Danube. The building can be illuminated at night from the inside with blue, pink, red and violet, due to its plastic casing.
Ars Electronica Center (AEC) (also called museum of the future) is a museum and research facility on the north bank of the Danube (in the Urfahr district), across the river from the Hauptplatz (main square). The AEC is a significant world centre for new media arts, attracting a large gathering of technologically oriented artists every year for the Ars Electronica Festival. The AEC museum is home to the Deep Space 8K, which offers a unique virtual world with wall and floor projections (each ), laser tracking and 3-D animations.
City Museum Nordico houses an art collection as well as a historical and an archeological collection, all of which relate to the city of Linz. About 16,000 people visited the museum in 2013.
Upper Austrian Regional Museum (Oberösterreichisches Landesmuseum) has three main locations that focus on different aspects of the regional history: The Landesgalerie (regional gallery) exhibits modern and contemporary art, the Schlossmuseum houses archeological findings all of which retrace Upper Austria's cultural history whereas the aim of the Biologiezentrum Linz-Dornach (centre of biology) is to retrace the region's natural history with an exhibition of about 16 million objects (which makes it the second biggest museum for natural history in Austria).
At the headquarters of the Upper Austrian art association (Oberösterreichischer Kunstverein) in the Ursulinenhof in Linz there are regular exhibitions of contemporary art.
Upper Austrian museum of literature (Oberösterrreischisches Literaturmuseum), the Adalbert Stifter Institute for literature and linguistics and the Upper Austrian house of literature (Oberösterreichisches Literaturhaus) all are situated in the StifterHaus, where Austrian writer, painter and educationalist Adalbert Stifter lived from 1848 to his death in 1868.
Upper Austrian forum for architecture (Architekturforum Oberösterreich) in the house of architecture (Haus der Architektur) attracts about 6,000 visitors annually. The forum organises lectures, exhibitions, conferences and competitions.
Upper Austrian open house of culture (Offenes Kulturhaus Oberösterreich, acronym: OK) is an art institution focusing on contemporary art.
Museum of Dentistry (Zahnmuseum) shows an exhibition of equipment used in dentistry from the early 18th century to the recent past.
Cowboy-Museum Fatsy presents cowboy culture, showing original pieces from the United States.

Music

The Brucknerhaus, a famous concert hall in Linz is named after Anton Bruckner. It is situated just some 200 metres away from the "Lentos". It is home to the "Bruckner Orchestra", and is frequently used for concerts, as well as balls and other events. It is also the venue of the "Linz Fest" which takes place annually in May as well as one of the venues during the Ars Electronica Festival in early September. In June, July and August the "Musikpavillon" is placed in the park where musical groups of different styles perform on Thursdays, Fridays, Saturdays and Sundays free of charge.

The Musiktheater (music theatre) was opened in April 2013 and is considered to be one of the most modern opera houses in Europe. It offers five stages of varying sizes; the big hall ("Großer Saal") with 1,200 seats, the BlackBox with up to 270 seats, the BlackBoxLounge with up to 150 seats, the orchestra hall ("Orchestersaal") with up to 200 seats and another stage in the foyer ("FoyerBühne"). Performances at the Musiktheater include operas and typically Austrian operettas, ballets and musicals.

The ensemble of the Landestheater (regional theatre) Linz used to perform musical productions as well as theatre productions at a venue located on the "Promenade" in the inner city of Linz (this venue is still referred to simply as "Landestheater"). Since the opening of the new Musiktheater, only theatre performances take place at the "Promenade" venue, whereas musical productions are shown in the Musiktheater. The Landestheater Linz is especially renowned for its theatre for young audiences called u\hof:.

The Kapu is a venue for various contemporary music styles, such as hip hop, noise rock and crust and also houses a cinema and a recording studio.

The Posthof is one of the biggest event centres in Linz with three rooms offering up to 630 seats or standing room for about 1,200 people respectively in the big hall. The programme focuses on contemporary art and covers concerts, theatre, cabaret, dance and literature. Artists from Linz are regularly invited in order to improve the local cultural scene; e.g. bands from Linz get the opportunity to play as pre-bands alongside nationally and internationally known artists. Altogether a total of about 250 events take place at the Posthof each year with a total number of visitors of about 80.000.

The Stadtwerkstatt is an independent association for culture and was founded in 1979. Its headquarters is located in the Urfahr district on the north bank of the Danube close to the Ars Electronica Centre and serves as venue for music events and other artistic and cultural activities. Situated at the same address is the Stadtwerkstatt's own Café Strom café/bar.

Wolfgang Amadeus Mozart wrote his Symphony No. 36 (1783) in Linz for a concert to be given there, and the work is known today as the Linz Symphony. He reportedly also composed his Piano Sonata 13 in B flat while in Linz, although it was published in Vienna.

Anton Bruckner was born in Ansfelden near Linz and spent several years working as a conductor and organist in Linz, where he also started to compose. The first version of Bruckner's Symphony No. 1 in C minor is known as the Linz version. The Brucknerhaus, a concert hall in Linz as well as its annual international Brucknerfest are named after him.

The musician and DJ Marcus Füreder, better known by his stage name Parov Stelar was born in Linz.

Cinema
The history of cinema and film begins in Linz in September 1896, when, as part of a variety programme, a film programme was shown in "Roithner's vaudeville" for the first time in Upper Austria. Until the next screening of a film it took until 20 March 1897, when Johann Bläser's travelling cinema guested in the "Hotel of the Golden Ship".

Until the opening of the first cinemas with regular programme, it took till the end of the year 1908. At that time, Karl Lifka opened his "Lifka's Grand Théâtre électrique" in that building, where already the very first film showing took place. Subsequently, the second cinema of Linz was opened a few months later.

As the owner of travelling cinemas, Johann Bläser, got settled in Linz, he bought the "Hotel of the Golden Ship", and installed a cinema in it, the "Bio-Kinematograph". 
The third stationary cinema, called "Kino Kolloseum", in town was founded around 1910 by the vaudeville operator Karl Roithner. Its first location was the former festival hall at Hessenplatz.

The Linz International Short Film Festival is the first film festival in Upper Austria to focus on international short films. It launched in October 2018 at the Moviemento in Linz, showing 114 films over four days. The concept goes back to the festival director Parisa Ghasemi.

Libraries 
In September 2007 the "Wissensturm", next to the central station, was completed. There the Main Library and the adult education centre are housed. In the same year the expansion of the National Library on Schillerplatz began. 
Main Library and 10 branches: 1,159,212 borrowings (2013)
National library: 86,262 Borrowings (2005)
The Main Library is the largest public library in Upper Austria. The library has a stock of 220,000 media, of which approximately 60,000 audiovisual media, as well as numerous magazines. The library also offers public Internet access and computers for surfing. The public library focuses on supporting reading. Thus in addition, regularly events such as readings, workshops or reading consultations take place.

Culinary specialties 
In Linz there are both traditional restaurants and old wine taverns, as well as modern and exotic cuisine. The influence of 140 nations can be felt in Linz's culinary offerings. A coalition of over 40 restaurants, cafes and among other locations bars are called "hotspots". Moreover, Linz has several à la carte restaurants and Gault Millau gourmet restaurants.

Typical dishes in Linz include not only the famous Linzer torte but also knödel and strudel in many different kinds of variations. Another specialty is the erdäpfelkäs, a spread made from mashed potatoes and cream. Some well-known chefs from Linz are Lukas Erich, who cooks in the Verdi and Georg Essig from the Der neue Vogelkäfig.

Regular events
Ars Electronica Festival: the Ars Electronica Festival is a festival for media art which has been taking place annually in Linz since 1986 and includes exhibitions, concerts, performances, symposia and interventions on changing themes that take place in public settings such as churches and industrial halls. The events focus on art, technology and society and the nexus among them. In 2015 about 92,000 visitors attended the Ars Electronica Festival. The topic in 2016 was "RADICAL ATOMS and the alchemists of our time". In 2017 the festival took place under the theme "Artificial Intelligence—The Alter Ego". The festival takes place in different public spaces and is considered to be a confrontation with and in the public sphere.
Black Humour Festival: Every two years in May, the Festival of Black Humour with guests from all over Europe takes place in the Posthof in Linz. The latest festival was in May, 2017 (04.-24.May) representing performances from Italy, Sweden, Germany and Spain.
Bubble Days: the Bubble Days have been taking place annually in June since 2011 and are hosted by local creative collective LI.K.I.DO. During the event a number of extreme sports shows, such as aviation performances and a wake boarding contest, the Red Bull WAKE OF STEEL, take place in the harbour of Linz. Additionally there are a number of art exhibitions and live music acts and visitors can explore the harbour on boat tours, in paddle boats or kayaks. In 2013 the Bubble Days reached a total number of 12,000 visitors.
Christkindlmärkte: Christmas markets at Hauptplatz and Volksgarten.
Crossing Europe Film Festival: Since 2004 this festival takes place annually in Linz. Starting at a total number of 9,000 visitors in the first year, the tenth edition of the Crossing Europe Film Festival in 2014 attracted over 20,000 people; 184 feature films, documentaries and short films from 37 countries were shown. The film screenings are accompanied by exhibitions, talks and live music acts ("Nightline"). There are currently eight different awards to be won at the Crossing Europe Film Festival in categories such as "CROSSING EUROPE Audience Award", the "FEDEORA AWARD for European Documentaries" and the "CROSSING EUROPE AWARD Local Artist".
Donau in Flammen (Danube in Flames): Annual music fireworks from June to August in Upper Austria on the banks of the Danube, accompanied by a broad supporting program. 
Festival der Regionen (Festival of the regions): The festival of the regions focuses on contemporary local art and culture and takes place every second year in varying locations across Upper Austria. It took place for the first time in 1993 and has been dedicated to different themes such as "the other", "marginal zones" or "normality".Höhenrausch: Höhenrausch is an annual art project that was developed in 2009. As part of the DonauArt, an inter-institutional cultural project, Höhenrausch 2018 is under the motto "The other shore". The element of water is worked on by international artists, with the definition of the shore being the focus of artistic exploration. Diverse spaces and places underline the presentation of this project.International Brucknerfest: Following the opening of the "Brucknerhaus" concert hall in Linz three years earlier, the international Brucknerfest took place for the first time in 1977. Whereas the first two editions were only dedicated to classical music in general and Anton Bruckner's pieces in particular, this changed in 1979 when the international Brucknerfest, the Ars Electronica festival and the "Klangwolke" (sound cloud), which now marks the beginning of the Brucknerfest, were merged to create a festival worthy of competing with those in Vienna and Salzburg. Taking place annually for three weeks in September/October it closes the Austrian festival season.Kinderfilmfestival (Kid's Film Festival): The international children's film festival is organized by the Kinderfreunde Oberösterreich. Films are shown in the original version while being live synchronised by an actor. The 29th festival will supposedly take place in November 2017.Kinderkulturwoche (Children's Week of Culture): The children's culture week has been taking place regularly since 2013 with plays, workshops, intro courses for children and teenagers.Klangwolke (Cloud of sound): Created as a link between the Ars Electronica Festival and the international Brucknerfest, this open-air multimedia musical event takes place annually at the beginning of September at the riverside Donaupark in Linz. It is free of charge and attracted about 110,000 people in 2013. Today there are three different "Clouds of sound", the visualised Klangwolke, in which modern music (mostly commissioned works) is staged with lasers, video projections, fireworks, ships, cranes, balloons, etc., the Klangwolke for children (since 1998) and the classical Klangwolke. Linzfest: This open air festival has taken place in Linz since 1990. It is financed by the city of Linz and several sponsors and organised for the broad public of all ages in cooperation with partners such as local cultural institutions. The festival is dedicated to a different theme every year (the last one in 2014 was "Old is the new new") and includes concerts, theatre, dance, comedy, art in the public space, culinary art, literature and parties, all of which are in line with the general theme of the event. It is held in the "Donaupark", a wide park area next to the Danube, also referred to as "Donaulände" or "Kulturmeile".Linz Marathon is held annually in April and attracted over 15,000 participants and about 100,000 spectators in 2013.Pflasterspektakel: The festival takes place annually since 1986 in the city centre of Linz and includes musical acts, juggling, acrobatics, pantomime, improvisational theatre, clownery, fire dancing, painting, samba parades, as well as a programme for children. With about 250,000 visitors (2014) the festival is one of the biggest street art festivals in Europe; its 28th edition featured 300 artists from 36 different nations.
The Stadtfest (City festival) is held annually in August in the inner city of Linz. The three-day festival features live music acts of different styles, with each music style being represented on a different stage. The concerts are held by national and international artists. Every year about 100,000 people take part in this event. 
Urfahraner Märkte: These fairs are held twice every year (once in spring, once in autumn) in Urfahr on the northern side of the Danube. They include a fun park (with roller coasters and a Ferris wheel) and a market (with food products from local and regional farmers) and attract about 500,000 people.

Other cultural institutions and venues
Archive of the city of Linz: collection of important documents of the city of Linz, presenting Linz' town history 
Atelierhaus Salzamt: living and working space for artists, featuring continuous exhibitions. 
Botanic garden: about 100,000 visitors every year; featuring a summer programme of music acts, readings and dance performances in the garden pavilion 
Donaupark Linz: contains sculptures by national and international artists such as Herbert Bayer, Max Bill and David Rabinowitch. The original idea of this project, called 'forum metall', by Helmuth Gsöllpointner and Peter Baum, was to set an example of Linz as an art metropolis with sculptures symbolizing a fusion of art and economy.
Design Centre Linz: modern congress and exhibition centre 
Johannes Kepler Observatory: opened in 1983 
Kinderkulturzentrum Kuddelmuddel: theatre for children which includes a kindergarten 
KUBA Jugendkultur: cultural institution for teenagers and young adults, founded by the Verein Jugend und Freizeit, which is an association for teenagers and young adults interested in culture 
Kulturhaus Reiman: venue for concerts, young theatre and cabaret 
Kulturzentrum Hof: cultural institution featuring concerts of different music styles, cabaret performances, theatre, readings and various workshops. The Kulturzentrum Hof tries to appeal to non-mainstream artistic styles.
Kunstraum Goethestrasse: founded in 1998, it is a location for temporary art 
Landeskulturzentrum Ursulinenhof: The Ursulinenhof houses cultural institutions and is a cultural venue (presenting e.g. exhibitions and hosting readings and theatre performances) and a press and event centre. 
Mural Harbor: The main focus of the Mural Harbor Cultural Association are graffiti and contemporary wall paintings. Local and international artists from Germany, Serbia, Greece, Spain, Brazil, Venezuela, USA or Australia have participated in this project. There are tours that offer to get closer to the graffiti art by river cruise. At the end of each tour you get the chance to attend a graffiti workshop. 
Tabakfabrik: location for exhibitions and musical events. For about four decades Gerhard Haderer, a cartoonist from Linz, has been criticizing and unmasking the obedient ones in our society. His most recent project titled "Schule des Ungehorsams" ("School of Disobedience") is an appeal to all the people interfering in order to contribute to shaping our society which makes us ponder on disobedience in a playful way. It will be hosted in the Tabakfabrik (tobacco factory) in Linz and Haderer himself will be the janitor. The planned activities will include exhibitions, public readings, publications, lectures and workshops.

Commemorative year 2018
The project "Linz 1938/1918", which started on 29 June 2018, commemorates the 100th anniversary of the founding of the Republic (1918) and 80 years of "political union" (1938). With this installation in the public space, presented in the city center, Linz fulfills its responsibility and commitment to maintaining peace with its declaration, making a contribution to dealing with the past. The idea is to reach people who have little relation to the years of 1918 or 1938.

Colleges and universities
The Johannes Kepler University Linz is situated in the north-east of Linz, and hosts law, business, social sciences, engineering and science faculties; about 19,170 students (2016/2017) are enrolled.
University of Art and Design Linz, public, for arts and industrial design; 1,328 students (2016/2017)
Fachhochschule Oberösterreich, Campus Linz; 879 students (2017/2018)
Anton Bruckner Private University for music, acting and dance; 871 students (2017/2018)
Educational college Oberösterreich; approx. 3,000 students
Educational college Diocese of Linz
Catholic Private University Linz; 341 students (2017/2018), which has been a Papal faculty since 1978
LIMAK Austrian Business School
KMU Akademie AG (Middlesex University London)

Among Linz's grammar schools is Linz International School Auhof (LISA), it is one of four IB (International Baccalaureate) schools in Austria. At the school, English is the main language for instruction.

Leisure activities

Parks and gardens 

Linz offers many parks and holiday areas:
Lakes and public swimming pools: Pichlinger See, Pleschinger See, Weikerlsee, Biesenfeldbad, Hummelhofbad, Parkbad, Schörgenhubbad. One of the first public swimming pools was the former "Fabriksarm", a Danube branch stream (from Parkbad to Winterhafen) that was filled up in 1890. Afterwards a makeshift at the "Obere Donaulände" was built, which existed until a flood in 1954. In 1901 the "Städtische Schwimmschule" (city swimming school) was built at the place of the former Parkbad. 
Botanischer Garten: About 100,000 visitors are attracted by Botanischer Garten, which makes it one of the most visited sights of the city since 1952. Situated at Bauernberg, and comprising 4.2 hectares, the arrangement distinguishes by its harmonious design, its abundance of plant species (about 8,000 different types in culture) and the multifaceted cultural and event programme. 
Donaulände or "Lände": public park on the Danube between Lentos and the Brucknerhaus. In summer, the Donaulände is a common meeting point among young people living in Linz. It also hosts the Linzer Klangwolke. 
Freinberg: a public park frequented by families and joggers.
Pfenningberg: Pfenningberg is a part of the northeastern green belt directioning to Steyregg. It overlooks the port facilities and the grounds of the VÖEST.
Wasserwald: Big Park (approximately ) in the south of Linz. The park is located in the district of Kleinmünchen, where large waterworks are situated. The most frequent visitors are walkers, joggers, Nordic walkers and dog owners, who enjoy the idyllic atmosphere of the park. The park is equipped with well-maintained sidewalks, playgrounds, two toboggan hills, a fitness trail, a running track and a senior park with chess. Furthermore, two public toilets are available.
Stadtpark: On 22 August 2003, the new Linz City Park between Huemer-, Museum-, Noßberger- and Körnerstraße was officially opened. With 10,807 square metres of green area, it is the second largest inner-city park. The city of Linz has acquired this area due to a barter with the Austrian postal service. Since Schiller Park in 1909, there has been no newly opened park of this magnitude in the centre of Linz.
Landschaftspark Bindermichl-Spallerhof: In the first phase of the establishment of the 8.3 -hectare sized area, which reconnects the boroughs Bindermichl and Spallerhof, the province of Upper Austria was responsible for the expansion of the park. The park replaces the urban motorway, which runs subterranean in this area since 2006. Old paths were re-established and until mid 2007 the city's gardeners designed prethe new parkland with 550 trees and various shrubs, perennials and flower beds.
In recent years, the zoo was able to increase its visitor numbers continuously. In 2014, about 132,000 visitors visited Linz Zoo.
Kirchschlag ski resort is located 15 km north of Linz and has three ski lifts: The Hauslift, the Waldlift or the Babylift. The special features of the ski area include the "How fast am I - route" which automatically measures the time or the night skiing. The ski area also has a 2 km long cross-country ski run, a curling ground and a nature ice rink.

Especially in densely built-up inner-city areas smaller parks are highly important for the inhabitants of Linz, the parks act as green oases. Along the main axis of the city centre of Linz, the highway, several such small gardens are located. These are on the one handside the Landhaus Park, which has been redesigned as part of an underground car park construction until 2009, whereby the old trees have been preserved. In addition, Hessenplatz or—park is located in the city centre of Linz. Hessenplatz was the centre of Neustadtviertel in 1884. Just off the highway Schiller Park is located, which replaced the Trainkaserne in 1909, and the Volksgarten, which was created in 1829 by an entrepreneur and bought up in 1857 by the city.

Donausteig 
Since the summer of 2010 it mainly leads alongside both banks of the Danube, from Passau through Linz and St. Nikola to Grein. The trail mainly runs through nature and leads to a number of viewpoints.

Harbour tour 
From the end of April until the beginning of October, the Design-Ship MS Linzerin offers a harbour tour of 100 minutes, three times a day (Tuesday until Sunday). The starting point of the tour is the Linzer Donaupark, and the tour goes along the Linzer Kulturmeile, passes the Brucknerhaus and ends at the waterfront mouth of ÖSWAG Schiffswerft Linz.

Linzer Stadt-Wald 
Linz is in the urban forest area ranking in front of Graz, even if only 500 hectares are owned by the city itself. These are sustainably managed and maintained, with 87 hectares of usable, 46 hectares of protection, 30 hectares of recreational and 353 hectares of welfare function. This is the reason why it is called Stadt-Wald, city-forest.

Sports
There are 302 Sport Clubs in Linz. 224 of those are a part of the three major umbrella organizations ASKÖ (108 Clubs with about 48,500 members), UNION (67 clubs with about 40,500 members) and ASVÖ (49 clubs with about 19,000 members). One of the more well-known clubs is LASK - they moved to Paschinger Waldstadion in the meantime—as well as "SK VÖEST Linz" — now called Blau-Weiß. Furthermore, the popularity of the ice hockey club "EHC Black Wings Linz" has increased, in particular after they won the championship in the seasons 2002/03 and 2011/12.

The EHC Black Wings Linz play professional ice hockey in the Erste Bank Eishockey Liga.

Generali Ladies Linz is annual WTA Tour tennis tournament held in city.

Born in Linz

Paul Achleitner (born 1956), banker and businessman
Frederic "Fritz" Austerlitz (1868–1923), Fred Astaire's father 
Mary Anne of Austria (1683–1754), Queen consort of Portugal
Hermann Bahr (1863–1934), writer, playwright, director and critic
Sybille Bammer (born 1980), tennis player
Waltraut Cooper (born 1937), artist, pioneer of digital art
Fritz Eckhardt (1907–1995), actor, director and writer
Frank Elstner (born 1942), presenter on German television
Valie Export (born 1940), artist
Marcus Füreder (born 1974), producer, DJ
Paul Haslinger (born 1962), musician and composer
Kurt Hentschlager (born 1960), visual artist
Igo Hofstetter (1926–2002), composer
Irene Kepl (born 1982), Austrian violinist and composer
Anton Koschany (born 1953), Canadian news producer, W5
Mateo Kovačić (born 1994), Croatian footballer
Marco Krainer (born 1981), Austrian specialty and TV chef with connections to the United States
Hans Kronberger (1920–1970), nuclear physicist
Vera Lischka (born 1977), breaststroke swimmer and politician
Verena Madner (born 1965), legal scholar, professor and constitutional judge
Birgit Minichmayr (born 1977), actress
Ida Pellet (1838–1863), actress
Alfred Peschek (1929–2015), composer and musician
Thomas Preining (born 1998), racing driver
Alois Riegl (1858–1905), art historian
Shlomo Sand (born 1946), professor of history at Tel Aviv University and author of the controversial book The Invention of the Jewish People
Fritz Schmid (born 1972), theater performed stage operatic singer
Franz Schumann (born 1960), professional wrestler
Herwig van Staa (born 1942), former governor of Tyrol
Christina Stürmer (born 1982), Austrian pop/rock singer
Richard Tauber (1891–1948), tenor
Elisabeth Theurer (born 1956), equestrienne
Fritz von Thurn und Taxis (born 1950), Austrian sportscaster
Franz Welser-Möst (born 1960), music director of the Cleveland Orchestra and the Vienna State Opera
Othmar Wessely (1922–1998), musicologist

Living in Linz

Adolf Hitler, (born in Braunau am Inn, 1889) Führer of Germany
Andrew Edge (born in Leeds, England, 1956), musician
Doug Hammond (born in Tampa, Florida, 1942), musician
Adalbert Stifter (1805, Oberplan – 1868, Linz), writer

Twin towns – sister cities

Linz is twinned with:

 Albufeira, Portugal (2008)
 Brașov, Romania (2012)
 České Budějovice, Czech Republic (1987)
 Charlottenburg-Wilmersdorf (Berlin), Germany (1995)
 Chengdu, China (1983)
 Dodoma, Tanzania (2019)
 Eskişehir, Turkey (2012)
 Gwangyang, South Korea (1991)
 Halle, Germany (1975)
 Kansas City, United States (1988)
 Linköping, Sweden (1995)
 Linz am Rhein, Germany (1987)
 Modena, Italy (1992)
 Nasushiobara, Japan (2009)
 Nizhny Novgorod, Russia (1993)
 Norrköping, Sweden (1995)
 San Carlos, Nicaragua (1988)
 Tampere, Finland (1995)
 Tuzla, Bosnia and Herzegovina (2014)
 Zaporizhia, Ukraine (1983)

See also
Linzer torte
List of mayors of Linz
Oberösterreich

Notes

Bibliography

External links

Official Linz web site
Linz Tourism web site

 
Austrian state capitals
Cities and towns in Upper Austria
Oil campaign of World War II
Populated places on the Danube
The Holocaust in Austria